The 1976 Washington State Cougars football team was an American football team that represented Washington State University in the Pacific-8 Conference (Pac-8) during the 1976 NCAA Division I football season. In their only season under head coach Jackie Sherrill, the Cougars compiled a 3–8 record (2–5 in Pac-8, sixth), and were outscored 331 to 240.

The team's statistical leaders included Jack Thompson with 2,762 passing yards, Dan Doornink with 422 rushing yards, and Mike Levenseller with 1,124 receiving yards.

Senior quarterback John Hopkins injured a knee in the second game making a tackle; sophomore Thompson relieved him and again the following week, then became the starter for the rest of the season. A home game was played in Seattle at the newly-opened Kingdome, against eleventh-ranked USC. Previous home games in Seattle in 1972 and 1974 were at Husky Stadium.

Previously the defensive coordinator at Pittsburgh, Sherrill was hired in late December 1975, but coached just one season in Pullman, leaving in early December to return to the Panthers as head coach. A week later, he was succeeded at WSU by Warren Powers, the defensive backfield coach at Nebraska.

Schedule

Roster

Season summary

USC

Postseason
For the first time in six years, no Cougars were selected in the NFL Draft.

References

External links
 Game program: USC vs. WSU at Seattle – October 9, 1976
 Game program: Stanford at WSU – October 23, 1976
 Game program: Oregon State at WSU – November 6, 1976
 Game program: Washington vs. WSU at Spokane – November 20, 1976

Washington State
Washington State Cougars football seasons
Washington State Cougars football